The following is a list of events affecting Tamil language television in 2021 from (India (Tamil Nadu), Singapore, Malaysia, Sri Lanka and Tamil diaspora). Events listed include television show debuts, and finales; channel launches, and closures; stations changing or adding their network affiliations; and information about changes of ownership of channels or stations.

Events and New channels

April

Debut Series and Shows

Soap Operas

Shows

Debut Web Series

Ending Series and Shows

Soap Operas

Shows

Deaths

See also
 2023 in Tamil television

References

2021 in Tamil-language television